David Rothman may refer to:
 David Rothman (medical historian)
 David Rothman (statistician)